Phillip Victor Sánchez (born July 28, 1929 – October 16, 2017) was an American diplomat and former United States Ambassador to Honduras under President Richard Nixon and former United States Ambassador to Colombia under President Gerald Ford. Since 1987 he was the publisher of the newspaper Noticias del Mundo. He became the President of CAUSA USA. He was on the Advisory Board of the University of Bridgeport.

He received a Distinguished Alumnus Award in 1975.

References

External links

1929 births
2017 deaths
Ambassadors of the United States to Honduras
Hispanic and Latino American diplomats
Ambassadors of the United States to Colombia
People from Fresno County, California